St Joseph's College is an independent Roman Catholic co-educational secondary day school, located in Echuca, Victoria, Australia. Established in 1886, St. Joseph's works under the governance of the Brigidine Sisters.

Notable alumni

Steve Di PettaBRW Young Rich List
Zach DouglasBig Brother housemate in the 2007 Australian series
Isaiah Firebracesinger and musician
Sarah JonesFox Sports presenter
Monica VanderkleyMarried at First Sight Australian contestant
Andrew WalkerAustralian rules footballer for Carlton FC
Brodie Kemp - Australian rules footballer for Carlton FC

See also

 List of non-government schools in Victoria
 Victorian Certificate of Education
 Vocational Education and Training
 Victorian Certificate of Applied Learning

External links
 St. Joseph's College website

Educational institutions established in 1886
Catholic secondary schools in Victoria (Australia)
Brigidine schools
1886 establishments in Australia